Cerosterna pollinosa is a species of beetle in the family Cerambycidae. It was described by Buquet in 1859. It is known from Sumatra, Java, Borneo and Laos.

Subspecies
 Cerosterna pollinosa pollinosa Buquet 1859
 Cerosterna pollinosa sulphurea Heller 1907

References

Lamiini
Beetles described in 1859